This is a list of governors for Gävleborg County of Sweden, from 1762 to present.
Fredrik Henrik Sparre (1762–1763)
Carl Sparre (1763–1772)
Nils Philip Gyldenstolpe (1773–1781)
Fredrik Adolf Ulrik Cronstedt (1781–1812)
Salomon von Rajalin (1812–1813)
Erik Samuel Sparre (1813–1843)
Lars Magnus Lagerheim (1843–1853)
Lars Adolf Prytz (1853–1861)
Gustaf Ferdinand Asker (1861–1883)
Carl Adolf Theodor Björkman (1883–1899)
Albrecht Theodor Odelberg (1899–1900)
Hugo Erik Gustaf Hamilton (1900–1918)
August Robert Hagen (1918–1922)
Sven Edvard Julius Lübeck (1922–1941)
Rickard Sandler (1941–1950)
Elon Andersson (1950–1954)
John Lingman (1954–1962)
Jarl Hjalmarson (1962–1971)
Hans Hagnell (1971–1986)
Lars Ivar Hising (1986–1992)
Lars Eric Ericsson (1992–2002)
Christer Eirefelt (2003–2008)
Barbro Holmberg (2008–2015)
Per Bill (2015–present)

Footnotes

References

Gavleborg